Mary Russell (born Mary Marcia Kalbach; April 22, 1912 – August 22, 2005) was an American actress in the 1930s who appeared in Western films and serials. She was born in Oskaloosa, Iowa and died in San Rafael, California. Despite a short film career from 1934 to 1938, Russell had parts in thirty films including the Westerns The Big Show and Riders of the Whistling Skull (1937). In the latter, she was the female lead alongside The Three Mesquiteers.

Filmography
 The Personality Kid (1934) as waitress (uncredited)
 Friends of Mr Sweeney (1934) as Prime's secretary (uncredited)
 The Man with Two Faces (1934) as debutante (uncredited)

 A Lost Lady (1934) – undetermined role (uncredited)
 Happiness Ahead (1934) as Bob's friend at the Pekin
 A Perfect Weekend (1934) as Trucking Company's office girl (uncredited)
 Flirtation Walk (1934) as girl (uncredited)
 The Secret Bride (1934) as Holdstock's secretary (uncredited)
 Bordertown (1935) as Miss Martin - Dale's other friend (uncredited)
 A Night at the Ritz (1935) as Miss Barry, Vincent's Secretary
 Gold Diggers of 1935 (1935) as second lady (uncredited)
 Black Fury (1935) as Mary (uncredited)
 Front Page Woman (1935) as information clerk (uncredited)
 The Payoff (1935) as secretary (uncredited)
 Ah, Wilderness! (1935) as Elsie Rand (uncredited)
 The Murder of Dr Harrigan (1936) as Nurse Bertha (uncredited)
 My Marriage (1936) as guest (uncredited)
 The Luckiest Girl in the World (1936) as manicurist
 The Big Show (1936) as Mary
 Roarin' Lead (1936) as Orphanage Assistant Mary
 Beware of Ladies (1936) as Williams' secretary (uncredited)
 The Mandarin Mystery (1936) as girl on street corner
 Riders of the Whistling Skull (1937) as Betty Marsh
 Larceny on the Air (1937) as nurse (uncredited)
 The Silver Trail (1937) as Molly Welburn aka Mary Allen
 Murder in Greenwich Village (1937) as Antoinette aka Angel Annie McGillicutty
 Man Bites Lovebug (1937; short) as Imogen
 Women in Prison (1938) as prisoner (uncredited)
 Extortion (1938) as Betty Tisdelle
 Squadron of Honor (1938) as Eve Rogers

References

External links
 
 

1912 births
2005 deaths
20th-century American actresses
American film actresses
Film serial actresses
Western (genre) film actresses